Zonulispira zonulata is a species of sea snail, a marine gastropod mollusk in the family Pseudomelatomidae.

Description
The length of the shell varies between 13 mm and 20 mm.

Distribution
This marine species occurs between Pacific Colombia and Panama

References

 Reeve, L. (1841–42) Conchologia Systematica, or complete system of conchology; in which the Lepades and Conchiferous Mollusca are described and classified according to their natural organization and habits. Longman, Brown,
 Green and Longman's, London. 2 volumes.

External links
 
  W.H. Dall (1909),  Report on the collection of shells from Peru ;Proceedings of the United States National Museum, Vol. 37, pages 147–294, with Plates 20–28
 
 Gatsropods.com: Zonulispira zonulata.

zonulata
Gastropods described in 1842